Special Dalida is a French studio album released by Dalida at the start of 1982.

Background
The album contains a French-language version of Dalida's big Arab hit "Helwa ya balady". The French version is dedicated to the late Egyptian President Anwar Sadat who was assassinated in 1981. Dalida went on to record a Spanish version of that same song called "Io T'amero (Tres Palabras)", with different lyrics.
Among other songs, the album contains a disco dance version of Dalida's 1959 hit "Le jour où la pluie viendra" composed by Gilbert Bécaud.

Track listing
 "Si la France"
 "Jouez Bouzouki"
 "Ensemble"
 "Quand je n'aime plus je m'en vais"
 "Comment l'oublier"
 "Le jour où la pluie viendra"
 "Danza"
 "Nostalgie"
 "Pour vous"
 "J'aurais voulu danser"
 "Pour toi Louis"
 "Bye bye"

References
 Dalida Official Website 

Dalida albums
1982 albums